Hoplunnis megista is an eel in the family Nettastomatidae (duckbill/witch eels). It was described by David G. Smith and Robert H. Kanazawa in 1989. It is a marine, deep water-dwelling eel which is known from the western central Atlantic Ocean, including Nicaragua and Panama.

References

Nettastomatidae
Taxa named by David G. Smith
Taxa named by Robert H. Kanazawa
Fish described in 1989